John's River or St. John's River is a small river that snakes its way through Waterford city before joining the River Suir at Adelphi Quay, Ireland.

Course
The river rises in the extensive marsh land stretching from the southern extremities of the city towards Tramore. It is first discernible in the environs of the Pitch & Putt course on the Tramore Road, between the course and the Regional Sports Centre. Another large stream passes between the course and Ursuline court, along which stretch is a pedestrian walkway. This stream joins the main river in the apex between the Inner Ring Road and the Tramore Road, behind the Westgate Retail Park. Before reaching this point, the main river weaves its way through the commercial area between the Inner Ring, Tramore and Cork roads.

From the confluence of the main streams, the river passes, largely unseen, for a stretch behind the Tramore Road Business Park until it is fed by another stream at the Gaelic Park. From here it begins to snake, first under Bath St. in Poleberry, past the Bohemians club sports ground, and under a bridge in the vicinity of Tesco Supermarket. It then runs the length of the Railway Square complex, with Miller's Marsh to the right, before turning and moving under John's Bridge, and on to the Waterside. By this point the river has become considerable, and requires non-trivial bridging. It is also tidal from at least this point.

The Waterside portion of the river is most picturesque, being flanked on its left by a quiet and leafy street. Along this section, it is spanned by a pedestrian footbridge leading to the old, long closed gas works, the bridge having fallen into quaint disrepair. The river then passes under Hardy's bridge, and assumes a melancholy character as it meanders between the People's Park and the city court house. This area is a very leafy and picturesque quarter of old Waterford city. Along this section it is spanned by a beautiful painted iron footbridge, linking the grounds of the court house to the park.

Ultimately, the river moves under an unnamed bridge at Lombard St., before broadening out between Scotch and Adelphi quays, where small boats are moored. This area is quiet and tranquil, having been rejuvenated as a residential area and public amenity in the past 15 years, but it retains its very definite, old maritime feel. This section of the river is spanned by a footbridge between Scotch and Adelphi quays, below which it joins the River Suir.

History
Historically, the rough area between the quays, the People's Park, Catherine St. and The Mall was marshland, which gave way to what was known as The Pill. The Pill was a pool of water, fed by John's River. It was drained, along with the surrounding marshland, in the late 18th century by the Wide Streets Commission, in order to build the Mall, and to expand the city eastwards. From this point on, the river had well defined banks all the way to the Suir.

Pollution
The river was described as "seriously polluted along most of its length" in a 2011 report.

See also
List of rivers of Ireland

References

Geography of Waterford (city)
Rivers of County Waterford